The Mason Brothers is a 2017 American crime drama film written, directed by and starring Keith Sutliff. It also stars Brandon Sean Pearson, Matthew Webb, Tim Park, Julien Cesario, and Carlotta Montanari.

Cast 

 Keith Sutliff as Ren Mason
 Brandon Sean Pearson as Jesse Mason
 Matthew Webb as Gage
 Tim Park as Jerry
 Julien Cesario as Fredrick
 Carlotta Montanari as Allena
 Michael Rayan Whelan as Orion Mason
 Erica Souza as Violet
 Alexandra Rousset as Helen
 Gregory Gordon as Diego
 Pelé Kizy as Cyrus
 Steve Bethers as Lance
 David Trevino as Tony
 Nazo Bravo as Adrian

Critics 
The film received mixed reviews. Michael Rechtshaffen of the LA Times said of the film "this lifeless serving of soggy pulp packs all the gritty authenticity of a gummy vitamin."

365 Flicks Indie Review Irish Film Critic
PopHorror.com Review
From Page 2 Screen
Following Films
Golden State Haunts
First Showing
Carry On Harry
Il Cineocchio
Nerdly
Bloody Disgusting
Horror Society
Search My Trash
Blaber Buzz
Flickering Myth
The Slaughtered Bird
Rouge Cinema
Tampa Bay Times
Screen Anarchy

External links

References 

2017 films
2017 crime drama films
2017 crime thriller films
American crime drama films
American crime thriller films
Films about bank robbery
Films shot in Los Angeles
American heist films
2010s English-language films
2010s American films